The Calvos Oak  (Portuguese: Carvalho de Calvos) is a European oak located in the parish of Calvos, in Póvoa de Lanhoso, Portugal. It is considered to be the oldest oak in the Iberian Peninsula.

References

External links
Página da Câmara Municipal de Póvoa de Lanhoso
Portal A nossa terra

Individual oak trees
Póvoa de Lanhoso
Individual trees in Portugal